The Central Bank of Solomon Islands is the central bank of the Solomon Islands located in capital city of Honiara. The Bank was established in February 1983 under the Central Bank of Solomon Islands Act 1976. The current governor is Dr. Luke Forau.

Functions 
Its official functions, under the CBSI Act of 2012, Section 9, are:
(a) to determine and implement monetary policy;
(b) to contribute to determining the exchange rate regime under section 16;
(c) to determine and implement exchange rate policy;
(d) to hold and manage the international reserves;
(e) to regulate the international exchange of money as further specified in this Act or any other law;
(f) to issue, regulate and manage the currency of Solomon Islands
(g) to collect and produce statistics;
(h) to inform the Parliament, Government and the public about its policies, functions and operations as further specified in this Act;
(i) to promote a safe, sound and efficient payment system;
(j) to regulate, licence, register and supervise financial institutions as further specified in this Act or any other law
(k) to act as banker, financial adviser and fiscal agent to the Government and to any other public bodies and organisations of Solomon Islands;
(l) to cooperate with and participate in international bodies and organisations concerning matters that are within its fields of competence; and
(m) to ensure that financial institutions establish within their organization consumer complaints units;
(n) to promote financial inclusion and related activities; and
(o) to carry out any ancillary activities incidental to carrying out its functions under this Act or any other law.;;"

The Bank is engaged in developing policies to promote financial inclusion and is a member of the Alliance for Financial Inclusion.

Governors
John G. FG. Palfrey, 1976-1978
Barry A. Longmuir, 1978-1980
Philip Coney, 1980-1981
Anthony V. Hughes, 1981-1993
Rick Houenipwela, 1993-2008
Denton Rarawa, 2008-2019
Luke Forau, 2019-

See also
Economy of the Solomon Islands
Solomon Islands dollar

References

External links
 Official site: Central Bank of Solomon Islands

Solomon Islands
Economy of the Solomon Islands
Banks of the Solomon Islands
1983 establishments in the Solomon Islands
Banks established in 1983